The HoPWF Heavyweight Championship is the top professional wrestling title in the House of Pain Wrestling Federation promotion. It was created on April 8, 1997, when Blackhawk defeated Skank in Hagerstown, Maryland. The title is defended primarily in the Mid-Atlantic and East Coast, most often in Maryland, but also Pennsylvania and West Virginia. There are 32 recognized known champions with a total of 55 title reigns.

Title history

References

Heavyweight wrestling championships